Alexander Harald St John Hanson-Akins (born 28 April 1961) is a Norwegian-born British stage actor who has appeared in numerous plays and musicals in the West End, and also on Broadway.

Personal life
Hanson was born in Oslo, Norway. His mother, Ellen, was half-French, half-Norwegian, and his father was English. After his parents' divorce, his mother remarried George Akins, a Nottingham businessman. He initially prepared for a career in hotels and catering, but then decided on a career in acting, and entered drama school. Hanson is an alumnus of Guildhall School of Music and Drama.

Hanson has been married since 1989 to actress Samantha Bond, and has two children with her, Molly and Tom.

Career
Hanson appeared in the West End production of An Ideal Husband in November 2010, opposite his wife Samantha Bond. He starred in the West End production of A Little Night Music, and also appeared in the transfer of that production to Broadway in 2009–2010.

Hanson starred in the high-profile West End revival of The Sound of Music in 2006 as Captain Georg Von Trapp. He was brought in to replace Simon Shepherd, who bowed out of the show during previews. Hanson originated the role of Khashoggi in London's We Will Rock You, leaving the production after seven months.

Hanson played Captain Macheath in the Royal National Theatre production of The Villain's Opera, Nick Dear and Stephen Warbeck's updating of The Beggars Opera in 2000.

in 1995, Hanson played Joe Gillis, the male lead in Sunset Boulevard, opposite Elaine Paige and then Petula Clark at the Adelphi Theatre. He played Pilate in the 2012 UK arena tour of Andrew Lloyd Webber and Tim Rice's popular musical Jesus Christ Superstar, and reprised the role in the 2013 leg of the tour.

In 2013, Hanson was cast in the title role in Stephen Ward the Musical, Andrew Lloyd Webber's musical telling the story of the Profumo scandal.

Theatre
 Marguerite as Otto
 The Sound of Music
 Talking to Terrorists for Out of Joint and Royal Court Theatre
 We Will Rock You (original cast) as Khashoggi
 Enter the Guardsman and Brel
 The Things We Do For Love
 Shallow End
 Sunset Boulevard as Joe Gillis
 Arcadia
 Aspects of Love as Alex Dillingham
 Valentine's Day
 Copenhagen
 The Villain's Opera
 Troilus and Cressida
 Candide
 The Merchant of Venice and The London Cuckolds
 Cracked and The Memory of Water
 A Little Night Music as Fredrik Egerman (West End and Broadway 2009/2010 revival)
 An Ideal Husband
 Jesus Christ Superstar (The Arena Tour as Pontius Pilate)
 Stephen Ward the Musical as Stephen Ward
 Follies as Ben Stone

Film and television

 Party Animals
 The Bill
 Kidulthood
 The Fugitives
 Murder City
 Auf Wiedersehen, Pet
 The Last Detective
 Rosemary & Thyme
 Heartbeat
 Beech is Back
 Relic Hunters
 Casualty
 The Merchant of Venice
 The Escort
 Unfinished Business
 Peak Practice
 Doctor Finlay
 Poetry Readings
 Ffizz
 Fellow Traveller
 Museums of Madness
 The Black Candle
 Taking the Floor
 Boon
 The Chief
 Six Characters in Search of an Author
 Lewis.

References

External links

My hols: Alexander Hanson

English male stage actors
Living people
Alumni of the Guildhall School of Music and Drama
1961 births
20th-century English male actors
21st-century English male actors
English male television actors
English male film actors
Male actors from Oslo
Norwegian expatriates in England
Norwegian male stage actors